The 1959–60 Nationalliga A season was the 22nd season of the Nationalliga A, the top level of ice hockey in Switzerland. Eight teams participated in the league, and HC Davos won the championship.

Regular season

Relegation 
 EHC Arosa - EHC Visp 4:6

External links
 Championnat de Suisse 1959/60

National League (ice hockey) seasons
Swiss
1959–60 in Swiss ice hockey